Alex Diehl (born 26 November 1987 in Traunstein) is a German singer and songwriter. He was selected as one of ten artists to compete in the German qualifiers for the Eurovision Song Contest 2016. German televoters selected his entry  ("Just a Song") into the final of three, where he finished second only to Jamie-Lee Kriewitz' winning title Ghost.

References

External links 

 

Living people
1987 births
21st-century German male singers
German songwriters
People from Traunstein